Amphidromus phamanhi is a species of air-breathing land snail, a terrestrial pulmonate gastropod mollusc in the family Camaenidae.

Habitat 
This species is found among leaf litter.

Distribution 
The type locality of this species is Lâm Đồng Province, Vietnam.

Etymology 
This species is named after Phạm Ngọc Anh from Vietnam who provided the type material.

References 

phamanhi
Gastropods described in 2016